Colin Heiderscheid (born 28 January 1998) is a Luxembourgish professional cyclist, who currently rides for UCI Continental team .

Major results 

2015
 1st  Road race, National Junior Road Championships
2016
 Internationale Niedersachsen-Rundfahrt der Junioren
1st Points classification
1st Stage 1
 9th Overall Tour des Portes du Pays d'Othe
1st Stage 3
2018
 3rd Road race, National Under-23 Road Championships
 5th Grand Prix de la Ville de Pérenchies
2019
 9th Youngster Coast Challenge
2020
 8th Road race, UEC European Under-23 Road Championships
 8th Grand Prix de la Ville de Lillers
 9th Puchar Ministra Obrony Narodowej
2022
 1st  Road race, National Road Championships

References

External links

1998 births
Living people
Luxembourgian male cyclists
European Games competitors for Luxembourg
Cyclists at the 2019 European Games